Jama Canton is a canton of Ecuador, located in the Manabí Province.  Its capital is the town of Jama.  Its population at the 2001 census was 20,230.

Demographics
Ethnic groups as of the Ecuadorian census of 2010:
Mestizo  72.5%
Montubio  21.0%
Afro-Ecuadorian  4.5%
White  1.7%
Indigenous  0.2%
Other  0.1%

References

Cantons of Manabí Province